First Street is a Metromover station in Downtown, Miami, Florida.

The station is located at Northeast First Street and Second Avenue, underneath The Loft 2 residential tower. It was opened on April 17, 1986.

Station layout

Places of interest
 Gusman Center for the Performing Arts
 Gesu Church
 Alfred I. DuPont Building
 New World Tower
 Galeria International Mall
 La Epoca Department Store
 The Columbus Bazaar Shops
 SunTrust International Center
 The Loft Tower
 The Loft 2
 Flagler First Condominiums
 Vizcayne
 50 Biscayne
 Capital Lofts Residential Tower
 250 Northeast First Street Building
 277 Northeast Second Street Building

External links
 
 MDT – Metromover Stations
 1st Street entrance from Google Maps Street View
 2nd Street entrance from Google Maps Street View

Metromover stations
Railway stations in the United States opened in 1986
1986 establishments in Florida
Brickell Loop
Inner Loop
Omni Loop